Van Ostaijen may refer to the following:
Paul van Ostaijen
Planet 9748 van Ostaijen